Tadmaya is a village in Oulhaca El Gheraba municipality, in north-western Algeria.

Populated places in Aïn Témouchent Province